The Forthing Jingyi X5 is a compact CUV produced by Dongfeng Liuzhou Motor under the Jingyi product series of the Forthing (Dongfeng Fengxing) sub-brand.

First generation (Fengxing Jingyi X5 I)

The first generation Dongfeng Fengxing Jingyi X5 was originally named simply Dongfeng Fengxing Jingyi. It was a compact MPV produced by Dongfeng Liuzhou Motor under the Dongfeng Fengxing sub-brand based on a modified chassis of the Mitsubishi Grandis. The only engine for the Jingyi is a 1.6 liter with 122hp and 155nm, mated to a 5-speed manual transmission. 

A version with different grilles and crossover cues including plastic claddings around the wheel arches and bumpers was also available as the Dongfeng Fengxing Jingyi LV or Dongfeng Fengxing Jingyi SUV before the facelift. After the facelift, the whole front DRG was updated and the crossover cues became standard. The compact MPV was renamed to Dongfeng Fengxing Jingyi X5 after the facelift as the Dongfeng Fengxing Jingyi became a series of passenger vehicles. Prices ranges from 99,900 yuan to 105,900 yuan.

Second generation (Forthing Jingyi X5 II)

This second generation Forthing Jingyi X5 was launched as a compact Crossover sport utility vehicle for China, it officially debuted during the 2016 Guangzhou Auto Show in November 2016. The second generation Jingyi X5 is powered by the previously available 122hp 1.6 liter engine and a new 147hp 2.0 liter engine, while the 1.8 liter turbo engine option is cancelled. Gearbox options include a five-speed manual transmission or CVT. Prices ranges from 89,900 yuan to 122,900 yuan.

References

External links
Fengxing Jingyi X5 Official website

Compact sport utility vehicles
Compact MPVs
Crossover sport utility vehicles
Fengxing Jingyi X5
Cars introduced in 2013
Front-wheel-drive vehicles
Cars of China